Zee Studio was an Indian English-language television channel featuring Hollywood films. It was part of the wider Zee Network.

History

The channel was launched on 15 March 2000 as Zee Movies. In October 2000, Zee entered into a joint venture with MGM and the channel was rebranded as Zee MGM. After MGM was bought by Sony, the channel name was changed to Zee Movie Zone (ZMZ) on 1 October 2004. On 28 March 2005, as part of Zee Network's revamp, it was renamed Zee Studio. Anurag Bedi is the business head of Zee studio along with other niche channels part of the Zee bouquet. Its HD counterpart was launched on 15 August 2011.

The Zee Studio brand was discontinued on 31 May 2018, with &flix being the new English movie channel.

References

External links
 Official website
 Zee Network

Television stations in Mumbai
Television channels and stations established in 2000
Zee Entertainment Enterprises
Defunct television channels in India